The Impossible Voyage, also known as An Impossible Voyage and Whirling the Worlds, is a 1904 French silent film directed by Georges Méliès. Inspired by Jules Verne's play Journey Through the Impossible, and modeled in style and format on Méliès's earlier, highly successful A Trip to the Moon, the film is a satire of scientific exploration in which a group of geographically minded tourists attempt a journey to the sun using various methods of transportation. The film was a significant international success at the time of its release, and has been well received by film historians.

Plot

Note: Since the film is silent and has no intertitles, the proper names and quotations below are taken from the English-language description of the film published by Méliès in the catalog of the Star Film Company's New York Branch.

A society of geographical enthusiasts, the Institute of Incoherent Geography, plans to make a world tour in such a way as to "surpass in conception and invention all previous expeditions undertaken by the learned world." At a meeting headed by President Polehunter, "assisted by Secretary Rattlebrain, by the Archivist Mole, by the Vice-president Humbug, the members of the office, Easily-fooled, Daredevil, Schemer, etc., etc.", the sumptuously dressed ladies and gentlemen of the Institute listen to Professor Daredevil's plan for the world tour, but reject it for being out-of-date. The president then welcomes the eccentric engineer Crazyloff. He explains his project for a new "impossible" voyage, using "all the known means of locomotion—railroads, automobiles, dirigible balloons, submarine boats…" The unusual plan is accepted enthusiastically, and preparations begin.

When work is complete, the machines and travelers are loaded onto a train and are sent to the Swiss Alps, where the travelers will begin their journey. They first board a touring automobile, the Auto-Crazyloff, and journey through the mountains. In an attempt to run at high speed over the summit of the Rigi, the travelers crash at the bottom of a precipice. They are saved by mountaineers and rushed to a Swiss hospital, where they make gradual but chaotic recoveries.

After they have finished recovering, the travelers board a train with their other vehicles attached to it, and make a second attempt at running over a summit: this time, the Jungfrau. Getting higher and higher every minute, with dirigible balloons tied to the train, they rise into space and are swallowed by the Sun. The travelers land with a crash on the Sun's surface. They are happy to be alive, but the heat is too much for them. Crazyloff directs the travelers to seek shelter in the train's gigantic icebox, but this plan goes too far in the other direction: moments later, the whole group has been frozen solid. Crazyloff finds a bundle of straw among the debris and starts a fire on the surface of the Sun to melt the ice. The travelers thaw out and are happily shepherded into the expedition's submarine. Crazyloff launches it off a cliff on the Sun, and it plummets through space to fall into an ocean on Earth.

After a few minutes of underwater sightseeing, a boiler problem causes the submarine to explode. The travelers are thrown up into the air, landing safely at a seaport amid the wreckage of the submarine. They return in triumph to the Institute of Incoherent Geography, where a grand rejoicing is held for them.

Cast
Georges Méliès as the engineer Crazyloff  (in French, Mabouloff; "maboul" is French for "crazy" or "crackpot")
Fernande Albany as Mrs. Polehunter, the institute president's wife (in French, Madame Latrouille, wife of President Latrouille; "avoir la trouille" is French for "to be scared or nervous"), one of the travelers
May de Lavergne as a nurse in the Swiss hospital
Jehanne d'Alcy as a villager at the seaport

Production

The original French title of the film, Le Voyage à travers l'impossible, comes from a stage spectacular of the same name, written in 1882 by Jules Verne. Méliès was probably inspired by memories of this play, but otherwise the film bears little connection to it; the plot structure appears to be inspired more closely by a previous Méliès hit, A Trip to the Moon.

The Impossible Voyage was made during the summer of 1904. The film, running to 374 meters (about 20 minutes at silent-film projection speeds), was Méliès's longest to date, and cost about 37,500 (7,500) to make. In its staging and design, the film is symmetrical with A Trip to the Moon: while the astronomers' progress toward the moon in that film is consistently depicted as left-to-right motion, the Institute of Incoherent Geography's progress toward the sun in The Impossible Voyage is consistently right-to-left. While most of the film was shot inside Méliès's glass studio, the scene at the foot of the Jungfrau was filmed outdoors, in the garden of Méliès's property in Montreuil, Seine-Saint-Denis. The factory set in the second scene recalls the Hall des Machines at the Paris Exposition of 1900. Techniques used for special effects include stage machinery (including scenery rolling horizontally and vertically), pyrotechnics, miniature effects, substitution splices, and dissolves.

Release

The film was released by Méliès's Star Film Company and numbered 641–659 in its catalogues, where it was advertised as an Invraisemblable équipée d'un groupe de savants de la Société de Géographie incohérente; pièce fantastique nouvelle en 40 tableaux. (The optional supplementary section was sold separately and numbered 660–661.) The earliest known English-language catalogues give the title as An Impossible Voyage in the United States and Whirling the Worlds in Britain.

The French catalogue descriptions give French names for many of the characters: the engineer is Mabouloff, and the Institute's membership includes Professor Latrouille (its president), Madame Latrouille, Madame Mabouloff, Secretary Foulard, Archivist Lataupe, Vice-President Patoche, and Professor Ventrouillard (who proposes the unaccepted project at the beginning of the film). The American catalogue gives Anglicized names (see Plot section above), while Mabouloff/Crazyloff's servant is called Bob in both languages.

A print of the film (though not the supplemental epilogue) was deposited for American copyright at the Library of Congress on October 12, 1904. As with at least 4% of Méliès's entire output, some prints were individually hand-colored and sold at a higher price. In the late twentieth century, a surviving hand-colored copy was donated to Méliès's family by the Czech Film Archive.

Reception

The Impossible Voyage was one of the most popular films of the first few years of the twentieth century, rivaled only by similar Méliès films such as The Kingdom of the Fairies and the massively successful A Trip to the Moon. The film critic Lewis Jacobs said of the film:

Film scholar Elizabeth Ezra highlights the film's sharp social satire, noting how the rich but inept members of the Institute "wreak havoc wherever they go, disrupting the lives of bucolic mountain climbers, alpine villagers, factory workers and sailors," and arguing that this conflict between upper classes and working classes is mirrored by other contrasts in the film (heat and ice, sun and sea, and so on).

References

Works cited

External links

 
 
 

Films directed by Georges Méliès
1904 films
French silent short films
French black-and-white films
French fantasy adventure films
French films based on plays
French science fiction adventure films
1900s science fiction films
Articles containing video clips
Fiction about the Sun
Films based on works by Jules Verne
Sun in film
Films shot in France
Silent adventure films
Silent science fiction films